Dimentia may be a misspelling of:

 RCA Dimensia, a high-end TV produced in the 1980s.
 Dementia, a condition associated with the decline of cognitive ability.

See also
 Dementia (disambiguation).